Jafatnagar Union is a union parishad of Fatikchhari Upazila of Chittagong District.

Geography
It borders Baktapur Union to the north, Dharmapur Union to the northeast, Abdullapur Union to the east, Raozan Upazila to the southeast, Hathazari Upazila to the southwest, and Samitirhat Union to the west.

Population
According to the 2011 Bangladesh census, Jafatnagar Union had 2,659 households and a population of 20,313, 10.7% of whom lived in urban areas.

Education
 Isapur BMC Degree College, Jahangpur
 Latif Rahaman High School, Fathepur
 Jahanpur Amzad Ali Abdul Hadi Institution
 Jahanara Momtaz Girls High School, Fathepur

References

Unions of Fatikchhari Upazila